Thomas Jefferson is a statue of U.S. Founding Father and president Thomas Jefferson in front of the Rotunda at the University of Virginia, the university he founded and designed. The statue was crafted by Moses Ezekiel in 1910 and was a copy of the Jefferson statue in Louisville, Kentucky.

Vandalism
In August 2017 the statue was the target of graffiti vandalism.

In September 2017 the statue was the target of protest in the context of the Charlottesville historic monument controversy and the recent Unite the Right rally. Protesters accused Jefferson of being racist and a rapist. They covered the statue of Jefferson in a way similar to how the city had recently covered the Jackson and Robert E. Lee sculptures. Among the protesters was one person with a gun whom the police arrested for public intoxication.

University of Virginia president Teresa A. Sullivan later responded by calling for civil discourse.

On Friday 13 April 2018 someone vandalized the statue with graffiti which read "rapist" and "racist". This day was Founder's Day, a holiday to celebrate Thomas Jefferson's birthday.

See also
 List of statues of Thomas Jefferson
 List of sculptures of presidents of the United States

References

University of Virginia
Jefferson
Vandalized works of art in Virginia
University of Virginia
Sculptures of angels